Where's Willy? is a website that tracks Canadian paper money, most commonly $5 bills, but also higher denominations. "Where's Willy" is free, supported by users who pay a fee for extra features. The name Willy refers to Sir Wilfrid Laurier - the seventh Prime Minister of Canada whose portrait appears on the $5 banknote.

Where's Willy? is a currency tracking spin-off of Where's George, a site that tracks United States dollars.

History
The free site, established by Hank Eskin, a computer consultant in Brookline, Massachusetts, allows people to enter their local postal code and the serial and series of any Canadian denomination from $5 up to $100 they want to track. Once a bill is registered, the site reports the time between sightings, the distance travelled and any comments from the finders, and anyone who registered the bill earlier learns about it by e-mail and/or text messaging.

To increase the chance of having a bill reported, users write or stamp text on the bills encouraging bill finders to visit whereswilly.com and track the bill's travels.

Since Canada has replaced the one and two dollar bills with more durable coins, the $5 note is the smallest denomination tracked by Where's Willy.

In April 2003, USA Today named whereswilly.com one of its "Hot Sites".

In 2005, the Montreal Mirror described the hobby as "the most joy to be had with the five-dollar bill since the illegal defacing of Laurier with Spock ears." While the Mirror describes this practice as illegal, a 2015 statement from the Bank of Canada explained that "Spocking Fives" does not violate the Bank of Canada Act or the Criminal Code.

As of June 7, 2021, Where's Willy? was tracking more than 5,400,000 bills totaling more than $80,000,000.

Researchers studying pandemics have used currency tracking sites to plot human travel patterns, to find clues on how to combat the spread of diseases like SARS.

Willy Index
The "Willy Index" is a method of rating users based on how many bills they've entered and also by how many total hits they've had. The formula is as follows:

Because of the nature of square roots and natural logarithms, the higher a user's bills entered and hits are, the more of each are necessary to increase the score.

See also
Currency bill tracking
EuroBillTracker
Twenty Bucks - movie about the travels of a $20 bill
Where's George? - American currency tracker

References

External links
 Where's Willy? web site
 Canadian Money Tracker Competing tracker.

Numismatics
Currencies of Canada
Internet object tracking
Internet properties established in 2001